Organizing center may refer to:

Microtubule organizing center
Spemann's Organizer
Certain groups of cells in mesoderm formation, see FGF and mesoderm formation
Primitive streak in Amniotes responsible for gastrulation
a small cell group underneath the stem cells in Arabidopsis and other plants
animal cap cells treated with activin

Pattern formation
Developmental biology